Ross 248, also called HH Andromedae or Gliese 905, is a small star approximately  from Earth in the northern constellation of Andromeda. Despite its proximity it is too dim to be seen with the naked eye. It was first catalogued by Frank Elmore Ross in 1926 with his second list of proper-motion stars; on which count it ranks 261st in the SIMBAD database.  It was too dim to be included in the Hipparcos survey. In about 40,000 years, Voyager 2 will pass 1.7 light-years (9.7 trillion miles) from the star.

Within the next 80,000 years, Ross 248 is predicted to be the nearest star to the Sun for a brief time, overtaking the current nearest star, the triple system Alpha Centauri.

Characteristics

This star has about 14% of the Sun's mass and 19% of the Sun's radius, but only 0.2% of the Sun's luminosity. It has a stellar classification of M6 V, which indicates it is a type of main-sequence star known as a red dwarf. This is a chromospherically-active star. With high probability, there appears to be a long-term cycle of variability with a period of 4.2 years. This variability causes the star to range in visual magnitude from 12.23 to 12.34. In 1950, this became the first star to have a small variation in magnitude attributed to spots on its photosphere as it rotates, a class known as BY Draconis variables.

Examining the proper motion of Ross 248 has found no evidence of a brown dwarf or stellar companion orbiting between 100–1400 AU, and other unsuccessful searches have been attempted using both the Hubble Space Telescope Wide Field Planetary Camera and by near-infrared speckle interferometry. Long-term observations by the Sproul Observatory show no astrometric perturbations by any unseen companion.

Distance from the Sun

The space velocity components of this star in the galactic coordinate system are  = [, ] km/s. The trajectory of Ross 248 will bring it closer to the Solar System.

Any future spacecraft that escaped the Solar System with a velocity of 25.4 km/s would reach this star 37,000 years from now, when the star just passes its nearest approach. By comparison, the Voyager 1 has an escape velocity of 16.6 km/s.

The closest stellar neighbors to Ross 248 are Groombridge 34, at 1.8 light-years away, and Kruger 60, at 4.5 light-years.

See also
 List of nearest stars and brown dwarfs
 Lists of stars

References

Sources
  Table 1.
  Table with parallaxes.

External links
 
 SolStation.com: Ross 248
 Image HH Andromedae

Andromeda (constellation)
Local Bubble
M-type main-sequence stars
Flare stars
248
0905
Andromedae, HH
BY Draconis variables